Denis Aleksandrovich Kulakov (born 21 November 1982) is a Russian sport shooter who competes in the men's 10 metre air pistol. At the 2012 Summer Olympics, he finished 26th in the qualifying round, failing to make the cut for the final.

References

External links

Russian male sport shooters
1982 births
Living people
Olympic shooters of Russia
Shooters at the 2012 Summer Olympics
Shooters at the 2016 Summer Olympics
ISSF pistol shooters
Sportspeople from Chelyabinsk